SC-40 may refer to:

 ISO/IEC JTC 1/SC 40, a standardization subcommittee of the ISO/IEC JTC 1 on IT Service Management and IT Governance
 SC-40, a computer developed by Systems Concepts
 , a United States Navy submarine chaser commissioned in 1918 and sold in 1924
 Scandium-40 (Sc-40 or 40Sc), an isotope of scandium